Hiram Kojo Kwarteng Boateng (born 8 January 1996) is an English professional footballer who plays as a midfielder for EFL League Two club Mansfield Town.

Club career

Crystal Palace
Born in Wandsworth, Boateng joined the academy of Crystal Palace at the age of 8. Progressing through the academy system and eventually into first team contention, he made his first team debut on 15 January 2013 in a 4–1 FA Cup third round replay defeat away to Stoke City.

At the conclusion of his first season as a professional Boateng was named the club's Academy Player of the Year. The 2013–14 season saw limited but impressive performances from Boateng, and he spent the final months of the season on loan to League One club Crawley Town. Ahead of the 2014–15 campaign, Boateng was involved in several pre-season friendlies for the first team but was later limited to the reserve team for much of the season. In March 2015 he extended his stay with the club until the summer of 2017.

Boateng spent the first half of the 2015–16 season on loan to League Two club Plymouth Argyle. On 3 October 2015, he scored his first professional goal in a 2–1 home win over former loan club Crawley Town. His spell was eventually cut short due to injury and he returned to his parent club. Following his recovery, Boateng made his league debut for Crystal Palace on 6 February 2016, coming on as a 70th-minute substitute in a 1–1 draw away to Swansea City, before returning to Plymouth for the remainder of the season in March 2016 where he later featured in all three of Plymouth's play-off matches. He was later named Crystal Palace's Development Player of the Year for 2015–16.

The following 2016–17 season saw further limited opportunities with Crystal Palace, and Boateng spent the majority of the year on loan to Bristol Rovers and Northampton Town.

Exeter City
Following the expiry of his contract, on 31 August 2017 Boateng made a deadline-day free transfer to League 2 club Exeter City. Following an impressive first two seasons, in April 2019 Exeter City manager Matt Taylor said Exeter would struggle to keep Boateng at the club if they weren't promoted, and by May he had not signed a new contract with Exeter. He made a total of 77 appearances for the club, scoring 3 goals.

Milton Keynes Dons
In May 2019, having declined the offer of a new contract with Exeter, Boateng joined up with former manager Paul Tisdale at Milton Keynes Dons, in a deal that would see Exeter City receive compensation due to the player's age. 

Following the departure of Paul Tisdale, Boateng fell out of favour under new manager Russell Martin, and in October 2020 was sent out on loan to League Two club Cambridge United for the remainder of the 2020–21 season, where he played a key role in his loan club's promotion to League One.

After Russell Martin left Milton Keynes Dons a week prior to the start of the 2021–22 season, Boateng was selected by interim manager Dean Lewington for the club's opening fixture away to Bolton Wanderers on 7 August 2021. Boateng, who had not even been allocated a squad number prior to Martin's departure, came on as an 81st-minute substitute and scored the club's third goal just two minutes later in an eventual 3–3 draw. It was his first appearance for the club since January 2020. That season he went on to make 37 appearances and score 4 goals, contributing to the club achieving a third-place play-off finish. On 13 May 2022, Boateng confirmed he would be leaving the club after three seasons.

Mansfield Town
On 15 June 2022, League Two club Mansfield Town announced Boateng had signed a three-year deal with the club effective from 1 July 2022.

International career
Boateng is eligible to represent Ghana as he has both a British passport and a Ghanaian passport.

Career statistics

Honours
Cambridge United
EFL League Two runners-up: 2020–21

Individual
Crystal Palace Academy Player of the Year: 2013–14
Crystal Palace Development Player of the Year: 2015–16

References

External links

Reserves profiles at Crystal Palace F.C.

English footballers
Crystal Palace F.C. players
Crawley Town F.C. players
Plymouth Argyle F.C. players
Bristol Rovers F.C. players
Exeter City F.C. players
Milton Keynes Dons F.C. players
Mansfield Town F.C. players
Cambridge United F.C. players
Premier League players
English Football League players
English people of Ghanaian descent
1996 births
Living people
Black British sportspeople
Footballers from Wandsworth
Association football midfielders